Chingiz Gurbanov (November 24, 1994, Qusar District, Azerbaijan – December 29, 2016, Tovuz District, Azerbaijan) was the soldier of Azerbaijani Armed Forces and "National Hero of Azerbaijan".

Biography 
Chingiz Gurbanov was born on 24 November 1994 in the village of Khazra in Qusar, Azerbaijan. After graduating from secondary school in 2012, he entered Azerbaijan Technical University, from which he graduated in 2016. He was drafted to Azerbaijani Armed Forces serving from 2016 through 2017.

Military career 
Chingiz Gurbanov was killed in a shootout with the Armenian forces on the Azerbaijani-Armenian border on December 29, 2016. As a result, Chingiz Gurbanov's body had remained on the Armenian side for more than three weeks. After many protests, the Armenian side finally handed over Chingiz Gurbanov's body to the Azerbaijani side on February 5, 2017.

Memorial 
On February 7, 2017 Chingiz Gurbanov was posthumously awarded the title of “National Hero of Azerbaijan” with the decree of Ilham Aliyev, the President of the Republic of Azerbaijan and Supreme Commander-in-Chief of the Azerbaijani Armed Forces for his personal courage in fulfilling his special military services and commitment to maintain the territorial integrity of the Republic of Azerbaijan. The documentary, entitled "The dream that came true", chronicles the life and military service of Chingiz Gurbanov.

Chingiz Gurbanov was buried on February 6 at the Martyrs' Lane cemetery in Qusar District.

Awards 

  — National Hero of Azerbaijan and Gold Star Medal (2017)

See also 
 Nagorno-Karabakh conflict
 List of National Heroes of Azerbaijan

References 

1994 births
2016 deaths
21st-century Azerbaijani Land Forces personnel
Azerbaijani military personnel killed in action
National Heroes of Azerbaijan
People from Qusar District
Azerbaijan Technical University alumni